High misdemeanor is an archaic term in English Law for a number of positive misprisions, neglects and contempts. A good example of this is treason. The most important example may be that of maladministration in high office.

Examples in English law
A number of United Kingdom statutes refer to particular crimes as being high misdemeanors:

 Discharging or aiming firearms, or throwing or using any offensive matter or weapon, with intent to injure or alarm the Sovereign  
 Where a Roman Catholic advises the Crown on the appointment to offices of the Established Church 
 Where a Jew advises the Crown on the appointment to offices of the Churches of England, Ireland and Scotland 

Blackstone describes a number of offences as being high misdemeanors, for example:

 treasonable words
 receiving stolen goods
 prison break
 maladministration of high office
 firing of one's house in a town

A number of statutory references to high misdemeanors have subsequently been repealed, including:
 The conviction of a returning officer for corrupt practices during an election to the Parliament of Ireland

See also
 High crimes and misdemeanours

Notes
  Section 2, Treason Act 1842
  Section 18, Roman Catholic Relief Act 1829
  Section 4, Jews Relief Act 1858
  Section 25, Parliamentary Elections (Ireland) Act 1820 and Section 75, Parliamentary Elections (Ireland) Act 1823

References
Halsbury's Laws of England
Blackstone's Commentaries on the Laws of England

English law